UFP Technologies, Inc., founded in 1963 and based in Newburyport, Massachusetts, is a designer and custom manufacturer of components, sub-assemblies, products and packaging utilizing highly specialized foams, films, and plastics primarily for the medical market.

Products and services
UFP Technologies manufactures its products by converting raw materials using laminating, molding, radio frequency and impulse welding and fabricating manufacturing techniques. Their single-use and single-patient devices and components are used in a wide range of medical devices, disposable wound care products, infection prevention, minimally invasive surgery, wearables, orthopedic soft goods, and orthopedic implant packaging.

UFP Technologies, however, is diversified in also providing highly engineered products and components to customers in the aerospace, defense, automotive, consumer, electronics, and industrial markets.  Typical applications include military uniform and gear components, automotive interior trim, athletic padding, environmentally friendly protective packaging, air filtration, abrasive nail files, and protective cases and inserts utilizing a variety of materials such as foam (cross-linked polyethylene, reticulated, melamine, specialty foam), woven and non-woven fabric, molded pulp, plastics (rigid, rubber, corrugated), natural fibers, films and adhesives.

The Company has also developed a line of standard products that are trademarked and branded, including:
 FlexShield  a flexible thermoplastic polyurethane film used for medical packaging, component, and product applications.
 BioShell  a container system designed to protect single-use bioprocess bags during storage, handling and shipping.
 CryoShell  an insulated shipper is to keep BioShells and other bioprocess bag container systems within an adequate temperature range during transportation.
 T-Tubes  insulation system specifically developed for process lines in cleanroom environments.
 Tri-Covers  foam caps designed to block and protect sanitary ends.
 Controlclean  absorbent wipes used to clean surfaces within cleanroom and controlled environments.
 Wine Packs  wine shipping solutions made from molded fiber.
 FirmaLite  lightweight, high strength automotive load floor made from a patented composite structure
 Pro-Sticks  reusable sanitizable nail file system.

Corporate history

UFP Technologies, formerly known as United Packaging Corporation, was founded in 1963 by William H. Shaw, Robert W. Drew, and Richard L. Bailly in Woburn, MA. Within one year the company expanded operations and moved its factory headquarters to Georgetown, MA. In 1967, the company changed its name to United Foam Plastics Corporation to reflect a broader market capability. On December 17, 1993 the company completed its initial public offering and formally changed its name to UFP Technologies, Inc.

Awards 

UFP Technologies was named to the Fortune Small Business 100 list of the fastest-growing, publicly held small companies in the U.S. in 2009 and 2008, with a rank of 47th and 75th, respectively.

UFP Technologies was named to the Forbes 100 Best Small Companies in America in 2011 and 2010 with the rank of No. 64 and No. 12, respectively.

In May 2013, UFP Technologies was named to the Globe 100 for the eighth consecutive year with the rank of No.60 in 2013 and No.67 in 2012.

UFP Technologies was named one of the "Best & Brightest Companies to Work For In The Nation®" in 2018, 2020, 2021, and 2022.

Acquisitions 
In 1993, the Company acquired Moulded Fibre Technologies, which focused on recycling old newspapers into molded fiber packaging for light industrial goods, electronics, and health and beauty products.

On February 4, 1997, UFP Technologies acquired the assets of FCE Industries Inc., formerly known as Foam Cutting Engineers, a supplier of foam plastics for industrial and consumer applications.

UFP Technologies acquired Pacific Foam Inc., a producer of specialty foam products for the health and beauty industry, in December 1998.

In 2000, UFP Technologies acquired Simco Industries Inc., a full-service supplier of automotive trim components.

UFP Technologies acquired three companies in 2009: Advanced Materials Group, a foam fabricator based in Rancho Dominguez, California, Foamade Industries Inc., a manufacturer of foam products and industrial machinery and E.N. Murray, a designer, converter, and distributor of foam plastic products, specializing in technical polyurethane foams.

In January 2013, UFP Technologies acquired Packaging Alternatives Corporation, a full service designer, converter, and distributor of foam
plastic products, specializing in technical polyurethane foams principally for
the medical market.

On February 2, 2018, UFP Technologies announced the acquisition of Dielectrics, Inc. based in Chicopee, MA, a designer, developer, and manufacturer of medical devices using thermoplastic materials as well as the innovator of the Reebok Pump introduced in 1989.

On October 13, 2021, UFP Technologies acquired Contech Medical. Founded in 1987 and headquartered in Providence, Rhode Island, with partner manufacturing in Costa Rica, Contech Medical is a global leader in the design, development, and manufacture of class III medical device packaging primarily for catheters and guidewires.

On December 23, 2021, UFP Technologies acquired DAS Medical. Founded in 2010 and headquartered in Atlanta, Georgia, with manufacturing in the Dominican Republic, DAS is a medical device contract manufacturer specializing in the design, development and production of single-use surgical equipment covers, robotic draping systems and fluid control pouches.

On March 17, 2022, UFP Technologies acquired Advant Medical. Founded in 1993 and headquartered in Galway, Ireland, with operations in Costa Rica and partner manufacturing in Mexico, Advant Medical is a developer and manufacturer of Class I, II, and III medical devices and packaging.

Investments 
In September 2013, UFP Technologies spent approximately $550,000 to build its sixth clean room, aiming to expand further into the medical device field.

In August 2014, UFP Technologies expanded its Georgetown, MA, operation with the addition of a clean room and high volume equipment to support the production of components made from medical grade thermoplastic polyurethane.

UFP Technologies expanded its North American operations for molded fiber packaging with a new location in El Paso, Texas, in November 2014.

In 2016, UFP Technologies relocated its corporate headquarters from Georgetown, MA, to Newburyport, MA.

On June 28, 2022, UFP Technologies opened a new medical manufacturing operation in Tijuana, Mexico. The 84,000-square-foot, FDA-registered facility will feature cleanroom and clean space medical device manufacturing and assembly.

References

External links 

Manufacturing companies established in 1963
Companies listed on the Nasdaq
1963 establishments in Massachusetts